"There I Go" is a song written by Hy Zaret and  Irving Weiser. Recorded in 1940 by Vaughn Monroe and his and his Orchestra, it was a top hit on the Billboard charts. Also recorded in 1941 by Will Bradley and his orchestra.

References

1940 songs
Vaughn Monroe songs
Songs written by Hy Zaret